Hakea dactyloides, commonly known as the finger hakea, is a widely distributed species mainly found in southeastern New South Wales, Australia. An attractive shrub or small tree for the home garden bearing sprays of cream-white flowers.

Description

Small branches are smooth and generally pale, covered with short matted fine hairs at flowering. The mid-green leaves taper to a point with three prominent longitudinal veins above and below. The solitary inflorescence  has 20-38 white flowers on a short stalk with white flat silky hairs and rarely rust coloured. Small white flowers often with a pink tinge appear along branches in axillary clusters from October to November.

Taxonomy and naming
Hakea dactyloides was first described in 1788 by Joseph Gaertner who gave it the name Banksia dactyloides. In 1800 it was described by Antonio Jose Cavanilles as Hakea dactyloides and published in Anales de Historia Natural. "The ending -oides indicates a resemblance, in this case to dactylos, Greek for finger, presumably a reference to the leaves of this species."

Distribution and habitat
A widespread species growing on the Central Coast,  South Coast, Tablelands of N.S.W  including the Central Western Slopes and north-eastern Victoria.  Hakea dactyloides grows on slopes, ridges and along watercourses on sandstone in sclerophyll forest. A hardy quick growing species tolerant of most situations.

References

dactyloides
Flora of New South Wales
Flora of Victoria (Australia)
Plants described in 1800